Turebergs Friidrottsklubb is an athletics club based in Sollentuna Municipality, Stockholm County, Sweden.

Some athletes affiliated with it are Olympic high jump champion Kajsa Bergqvist and her coach Bengt Jönsson, sprinter Eric Josjö and high jumper Thomas Eriksson.

External links
 Turebergs FK

Athletics clubs in Sweden
Sporting clubs in Stockholm
1997 establishments in Sweden
Sports clubs established in 1997